Cercopithecoides is an extinct genus of colobine monkey from Africa which lived during the latest Miocene to the Pleistocene period.

The type species, Cercopithecoides williamsi, was named by O. D. Mollett in 1947, based on a partial cranium and mandible of a male individual from Makapansgat, South Africa. It has since been found across many Pliocene and Pleistocene sites in South Africa, Angola, and Kenya. The largest species, Cercopithecoides kimeui, was named by Meave Leakey in 1982, based on fossils found in Kenya and Tanzania.

References

Miocene primates
Pliocene primates
Pleistocene primates
Miocene mammals of Africa
Pliocene mammals of Africa
Pleistocene mammals of Africa
Old World monkeys
Fossil taxa described in 1947